General elections were held in Guinea on 27 December 1974 to elect a President and National Assembly. The country was a one-party state at the time, with the Democratic Party of Guinea – African Democratic Rally as the sole legal party. Its leader Ahmed Sékou Touré was re-elected President unopposed, whilst in the National Assembly elections the party produced a list of 150 candidates for the 150 seats (increased from 75). It was ultimately approved by 100% of voters with turnout reported to be 99.7%.

Results

President

National Assembly

References

Presidential elections in Guinea
Guinea
1974 in Guinea
One-party elections
Single-candidate elections
Election and referendum articles with incomplete results